IGCC may refer to:

 Integrated gasification combined cycle, a power generation technology
 International Green Construction Code
 UC Institute on Global Conflict and Cooperation
 International Grid Control Cooperation
 Intel Graphics Command Center